Louis-Charles Caigniez (13 April 1762 – 19 February 1842) was a 19th-century French playwright.

Biography 
Endowed with a real talent for the stage, Caigniez competed on the boulevard theaters with René Charles Guilbert de Pixérécourt and was nicknamed "the Racine of melodrama", of which Pixérécourt was called the Corneille.

Caigniez literary taste was enough to succeed in more delicate works. His three-act comedy Volage presented in 1807 at the Théâtre Louvois and his Méprise en diligence, another three-act comedy given at the Théâtre Favart in 1819, are notable by their original and comic situations.

The main success of this author in the melodrama genre are: le Jugement de Salomon (1802) and la Pie voleuse, ou la Servante de Palaiseau (1815). These two plays were presented with the same long success, both in Paris and in the cities of the province and abroad ; Rossini composed his opera La gazza ladra after the second.

Works 
1804: Androclès, ou le Lion reconnaissant, inspired the libretto for L'esule di Roma by Gaetano Donizetti (1828)
1804: les Amants en poste 
1805: La Forêt d’Hermanstadt 
1807: Le Faux Alexis, ou Mariage par Vengeance 
1809: Les Enfants du bûcheron 
1810: La Fille adoptive, ou les deux mères rivales 
1812: Le Juif-Errant 
1813: La Morte vivante 
 Edgar ou La chasse aux loups used by Simon Mayr for his opera Le due duchesse, ossia La caccia dei lupi (1814)
1815: La Pie voleuse ou la Servante de Palaiseau, melodrama in 3 acts with Théodore Baudouin d'Aubigny, Théâtre de la Porte-Saint-Martin, (29 April)
1815: Jean de Calais which served as a base for the opera Gianni di Calais by Donizetti (1828) 
1817: Les Corbeaux accusateurs 
1821: Ugolin, ou la Tour de la Faim 
1822: La Belle au bois dormant

Sources 
 Gustave Vapereau, Dictionnaire universel des littératures, Paris, Hachette, 1876, 

19th-century French dramatists and playwrights
People from Arras
1762 births
1842 deaths